25 Arietis is a star in the equatorial constellation of Cetus, near the modern constellation boundary with Aries for which it is named. 25 Arietis is the Flamsteed designation. It has an apparent visual magnitude of 6.45, placing it near the lower limit of visibility to the naked eye.

This is an ordinary F-type main-sequence star with a stellar classification of F5 V. It is about 1.6 billion years old with an estimated 1.19 times the mass of the Sun and 1.44 times the Sun's radius. The star is radiating 2.9 times the Sun's luminosity from its photosphere at an effective temperature of around 6,274 K.

References

F-type main-sequence stars
Cetus (constellation)
Durchmusterung objects
Arietis, 25
015228
011427